16-Hydroxytabersonine is a terpene indole alkaloid produced by the plant Catharanthus roseus.  The metabolite is an intermediate in the formation of vindoline, a precursor needed for formation of the pharmaceutically valuable vinblastine and vincristine.  16-hydroxytabersonine is formed from the hydroxylation of tabersonine by tabersonine 16-hydroxylase (T16H).  Tabersonine 16-O-methyltransferase (16OMT) methylates the hydroxylated 16 position to form 16-methoxytabersonine.

References

Indole alkaloids